Heath Rylance (born June 21, 1972) is a former American football quarterback who played four seasons in the Canadian Football League with the Saskatchewan Roughriders and Calgary Stampeders. He played college football at Augustana College.

Professional career

Saskatchewan Roughriders
Rylance was signed by the Saskatchewan Roughriders in March 1995. He was released by the Roughriders on July 3, 1999.

Calgary Stampeders
Rylance signed with the Calgary Stampeders on August 12, 1999. He was released by the Stampeders on August 25, 1999.

References

External links
Just Sports Stats

Living people
1972 births
Players of American football from South Dakota
American football quarterbacks
Canadian football quarterbacks
American players of Canadian football
Augustana (South Dakota) Vikings football players
Saskatchewan Roughriders players
Calgary Stampeders players
People from Mitchell, South Dakota